Mastermind is the third mini-album by South Korean boy band Beast, and was released by Cube Entertainment on September 30, 2010. The lead single "Soom" is composed by Shinsadong Tiger and Choi Gyusung with lyrics written by both the composers, Rado and member Yong Junhyung. The song "Break Down" is created by Lim Sanghyuk and Lee Joohyung.

The song "Mastermind", just like the title of the album, served as the intro track with the word meaning, “someone who can control other object with ease.” It has the hidden meaning of Beast wanting to remove the rookie image and state of the public that they want to show their own style of music.

History
On September 16, 2010, Cube Entertainment announced that Beast would be revealing a ballad-R&B single from their third album prior to Beast's comeback. On September 17 at 10 AM KST, "Jumeogeul Kkwak Jwigo" was revealed on an online music site. "Jumeogeul Kkwak Jwigo" rose up to first place on various music sites.

On September 24 at 10 AM KST, a teaser video for the lead single "Soom" was released on Beast's official homepage and other various online portal sites. The visit from the fans waiting for the release of the video of Beast's comeback caused an amount of traffic that caused the server to go down for a moment. In the teaser, member Yong Jun Hyung was seen lying on the ground where Son Naeun, dressed in red, put on an oxygen mask for him and gains conscience. Other scenes in the teaser video showed Lee Gi Kwang and Jang Hyun Seung dancing and showing off their muscular builds in the rain.

On September 25 and 26, teaser audio clips for "Soom" were revealed on KBS's COOL FM Narsha's Raise the Volume. A military-look concept photo for Mastermind was revealed on September 27, showing off Beast's manly side along with a chic modern feel.

Beast released the full music video to "Soom" on September 28 and made a comeback on KBS's Music Bank on September 30, performing "Breath" and a shorter version of "Mastermind".

Choreography
The dance for "Soom" was choreographed by Haw from South Korean hip hop dance crew, Prepix and co-choreographed by Mike Song.

Track listing

Charts

Albums chart

Singles chart

Release history

References

External links
 Beast Official website

Cube Entertainment EPs
Dance-pop EPs
Highlight (band) EPs
2010 EPs
Korean-language EPs